Gary James Ayres (born 28 September 1960) is a former Australian rules footballer who played for the Hawthorn Football Club in the Australian Football League (AFL). He is currently the senior coach for the Montrose Football Club in the Eastern Football Netball League (EFNL). Ayres' playing career is honored by the existence of the Gary Ayres Award, an annual award given to the player judged best-afield by the AFL Coaches Association throughout each AFL finals series.

Playing career

Hawthorn
Beginning his playing career with Hawthorn in 1978, he had an illustrious career spanning from 1978 until 1993, playing 269 games and booting 70 goals.

He was part of a total of 5 premiership teams – 1983, 1986, 1988, 1989, and 1991.  He won the Norm Smith Medal twice, adjudged best on ground in 1986 and 1988 and is one of only four players in the history of the AFL to do so.

Ayres captained Victoria against Tasmania in the 1989 State of Origin contest.

He captained the Hawks in his final two years from 1992 to 1993.

Gary played most of his football in defence, particular the back pocket position. He was nicknamed "Conan" by fans in reference to his powerful upper-body physique.  He used his body to good effect in body on body contested situations. Ayres' height and weight was 187 cm / 100 kg. Allan Jeans described Ayres as "a good driver in heavy traffic"

In 2020, Ayres revealed that the circumstances that led to his retirement from his playing career with Hawthorn at the end of the 1993 season, was after a disconnect with senior coach Alan Joyce and his frustration after being dropped to the reserves side.

Statistics

|- style="background-color: #EAEAEA"
! scope="row" style="text-align:center" | 1978
|style="text-align:center;"|
| 33 || 2 || 3 || 0 || 9 || 8 || 17 || 4 ||  || 1.5 || 0.0 || 4.5 || 4.0 || 8.5 || 2.0 ||  || 0
|-
! scope="row" style="text-align:center;" | 1979
|style="text-align:center;"|
| 7 || 10 || 11 || 12 || 72 || 26 || 98 || 19 ||  || 1.1 || 1.2 || 7.2 || 2.6 || 9.8 || 1.9 ||  || 0
|- style="background-color: #EAEAEA"
! scope="row" style="text-align:center" | 1980
|style="text-align:center;"|
| 7 || 7 || 5 || 4 || 44 || 17 || 61 || 16 ||  || 0.7 || 0.6 || 6.3 || 2.4 || 8.7 || 2.3 ||  || 0
|-
! scope="row" style="text-align:center;" | 1981
|style="text-align:center;"|
| 7 || 3 || 0 || 0 || 12 || 5 || 17 || 3 ||  || 0.0 || 0.0 || 4.0 || 1.7 || 5.7 || 1.0 ||  || 0
|- style="background-color: #EAEAEA"
! scope="row" style="text-align:center" | 1982
|style="text-align:center;"|
| 7 || 14 || 0 || 0 || 120 || 110 || 230 || 50 ||  || 0.0 || 0.0 || 8.6 || 7.9 || 16.4 || 3.6 ||  || 2
|-
| scope=row bgcolor=F0E68C | 1983# ||  || 7
| 18 || 1 || 1 || 189 || 95 || 284 || 68 ||  || 0.1 || 0.1 || 10.5 || 5.3 || 15.8 || 3.8 ||  || 6
|- style="background-color: #EAEAEA"
! scope="row" style="text-align:center" | 1984
|style="text-align:center;"|
| 7 || 21 || 2 || 2 || 294 || 96 || 390 || 92 ||  || 0.1 || 0.1 || 14.0 || 4.6 || 18.6 || 4.4 ||  || 12
|-
! scope="row" style="text-align:center;" | 1985
|style="text-align:center;"|
| 7 || 24 || 1 || 3 || 289 || 95 || 384 || 89 ||  || 0.0 || 0.1 || 12.0 || 4.0 || 16.0 || 3.7 ||  || 2
|- style="background-color: #EAEAEA"
| scope=row bgcolor=F0E68C | 1986# ||  || 7
| 25 || 5 || 1 || 278 || 173 || 451 || 78 ||  || 0.2 || 0.0 || 11.1 || 6.9 || 18.0 || 3.1 ||  || 0
|-
! scope="row" style="text-align:center" | 1987
|style="text-align:center;"|
| 7 || 24 || 5 || 4 || 238 || 157 || 395 || 95 || 44 || 0.2 || 0.2 || 9.9 || 6.5 || 16.5 || 4.0 || 1.8 || 5
|- style="background-color: #EAEAEA"
| scope=row bgcolor=F0E68C | 1988# ||  || 7
| 22 || 1 || 8 || 308 || 133 || 441 || 113 || 32 || 0.0 || 0.4 || 14.0 || 6.0 || 20.0 || 5.1 || 1.5 || 11
|-
| scope=row bgcolor=F0E68C | 1989# ||  || 7
| 24 || 5 || 3 || 307 || 169 || 476 || 105 || 48 || 0.2 || 0.1 || 12.8 || 7.0 || 19.8 || 4.4 || 2.0 || 6
|- style="background-color: #EAEAEA"
! scope="row" style="text-align:center" | 1990
|style="text-align:center;"|
| 7 || 22 || 15 || 8 || 248 || 153 || 401 || 69 || 46 || 0.7 || 0.4 || 11.3 || 7.0 || 18.2 || 3.1 || 2.1 || 4
|-
| scope=row bgcolor=F0E68C | 1991# ||  || 7
| 22 || 14 || 10 || 245 || 174 || 419 || 74 || 50 || 0.6 || 0.5 || 11.1 || 7.9 || 19.0 || 3.4 || 2.3 || 0
|- style="background-color: #EAEAEA"
! scope="row" style="text-align:center" | 1992
|style="text-align:center;"|
| 7 || 14 || 1 || 1 || 143 || 114 || 257 || 53 || 25 || 0.1 || 0.1 || 10.2 || 8.1 || 18.4 || 3.8 || 1.8 || 2
|-
! scope="row" style="text-align:center" | 1993
|style="text-align:center;"|
| 7 || 17 || 1 || 1 || 148 || 98 || 246 || 59 || 23 || 0.1 || 0.1 || 8.7 || 5.8 || 14.5 || 3.5 || 1.4 || 1
|- class="sortbottom"
! colspan=3| Career
! 269
! 70
! 58
! 2944
! 1623
! 4567
! 987
! 268
! 0.3
! 0.2
! 10.9
! 6.0
! 17.0
! 3.7
! 1.8
! 51
|}

Honours and achievements
Team
 5× VFL/AFL premiership player: 1983, 1986, 1988, 1989, 1991
 2× McClelland Trophy: 1986, 1988

Individual
 2× Norm Smith Medal: 1986, 1988
 Peter Crimmins Medal: 1986
 3× State of Origin (Victoria): 1984, 1989, 1990
 State of Origin (Victoria 2nd XVIII team): 1990 (c)
Australian Football Hall of Fame: 1999 Inductee
Hawthorn F.C. Hall of Fame
'Hawthorn F.C. Team of the Century

Coaching career

Geelong Football Club senior coach (1995-1999)
After his retirement from his playing career, Ayres turned to coaching; starting as an assistant coach under senior coach Malcolm Blight at Geelong for the 1994 season. After Blight's resignation in 1994, following Geelong's defeat to the West Coast Eagles in the 1994 Grand Final, Ayres was appointed Geelong Football Club senior coach for the 1995 season after Blight handed the coaching reigns to Ayres. In his first year and season as Geelong Football Club senior coach, Geelong lost to Carlton in the 1995 Grand Final by a margin of 61 points under Ayres, which was their fourth Grand Final defeat in seven seasons. In the 1996 season, Geelong under Ayres finished seventh with thirteen wins, one draw and eight losses, where they made it to the qualifying final losing to North Melbourne. In the 1997 season, Ayres guided Geelong to finish second on the ladder with fifteen wins and seven losses, but however lost to North Melbourne again in the qualifying finals and were eliminated by the eventual premiers Adelaide in the semi finals. In the 1998 season, Geelong with Ayres struggled and finished twelve with nine wins and thirteen losses. In 1999, at the end of a disappointing 1999 season where Geelong under Ayres finished eleventh with ten wins and twelve losses and after the board of Geelong Football Club, that was led by CEO Brian Cook, refused to offer him a contract extension beyond the 2000 AFL season, Ayres quit as Geelong Football Club senior coach to take the coaching position at Adelaide where Malcolm Blight had, again, just resigned. Ayres was replaced by Mark Thompson as Geelong Football Club senior coach.

Ayres coached Geelong Football Club to a total of 116 games with 65 wins 50 losses and one draw to a winning percentage of 56 percent.

Adelaide Football Club senior coach (2000-2004)
Ayres once again replaced Malcolm Blight, this time as Adelaide Football Club senior coach at the end of the 1999 season and coached Adelaide from 2000 until 2004. In his first season at the Crows, the club struggled and finished eleventh with nine wins and thirteen losses at the end of the 2000 season. Ayres, however guided the Crows to the final series in the next three seasons in the 2001, 2002 and 2003, including reaching the elimination final in 2001, where they were eliminated by Carlton, the preliminary final in 2002, where they were eliminated by the eventual runners-up Collingwood and the Semi finals in 2003, where they were eliminated by the eventual premiers Brisbane Lions. However, during the 2004 season, the club with Ayres found themselves struggling again where Adelaide sat twelfth on the ladder with four wins and nine losses after Round 13, 2004. When told he would not continue as senior coach for the 2005 season, Ayres quit midseason. Though he had been given the opportunity to stay for the rest of the 2004 season, he told the Adelaide board that if he could not coach the following year, he would leave immediately. He then walked out of the club's office without shaking hands or responding to media enquiries. Ayres coached Adelaide to a total of 107 games with a 55–52 win–loss ratio to a winning percentage of 51.4 percent. He was replaced by assistant coach Neil Craig as caretaker senior coach of Adelaide Football Club for the remainder of the 2004 season and was eventually employed full-time senior coach.

Post AFL senior coaching roles

Essendon Football Club assistant coach (2006-2007)
In 2006, he returned to coaching as assistant coach at the Essendon Football Club, under senior coach Kevin Sheedy. When Matthew Knights was appointed as senior coach of Essendon at the end of the 2007 season, Knights vowed to modernise the club's support staff, Ayres subsequently lost his position as assistant coach.

Port Melbourne Football Club senior coach (VFL) (2008-2021)
In 2008, Ayres was appointed senior coach of the Port Melbourne Football Club in the Victorian Football League. He is the longest-serving coach in the club's history. Ayres has coached Port Melbourne to two premierships and three minor premierships, which included the club's perfect 2011 season, in which the club won all 21 of its premiership matches. Ayres then led the club to another premiership in 2017. Ayres left the Port Melbourne Football Club at the end of the 2021 season, after he served as senior coach of the club for a total of fourteen years. Ayres came to this decision after being overlooked for re-appointment as senior coach for the 2022 season, when the club decided not to renew his contract as senior coach, when it expired at the end of 2021.

Head coaching record

 Explanatory notes 

Other roles and contributions
Awards
On 24 October 2000, Ayres was awarded the Australian Sports Medal for contribution to Australian Football.

Media career
In 2005, Ayres spent the year in the media on Fox Footy Channel. Prior to that he also had a stint on Seven's Talking Footy''.

References

External links

Footywire: Gary Ayres Coaching Record

1960 births
Living people
Geelong Football Club coaches
Adelaide Football Club coaches
Hawthorn Football Club players
Hawthorn Football Club Premiership players
Port Melbourne Football Club coaches
Warragul Football Club players
Peter Crimmins Medal winners
Norm Smith Medal winners
Australian Football Hall of Fame inductees
Victorian State of Origin players
Australian rules footballers from Victoria (Australia)
Recipients of the Australian Sports Medal
People from Warragul
Five-time VFL/AFL Premiership players